Chow Kam Fai, David (born 1950 in Hong Kong) is a Macau businessman and politician. His businesses are involved in the tourism, entertainment and gambling industries. and was a member of the Legislative Assembly of Macau.  He is the CEO of Macau Landmark and Macau Fisherman's Wharf Investment Co Ltd. He is also Honored Consul of the Republic of Cape Verde to Macau SAR.

His wife, Melinda Chan, is the founder of Macau Zhuhai Communal Association, a major political association in Macau.

Link
Official website of Chow Kam Fai

References

1950 births
Living people
Businesspeople in the casino industry
Macau businesspeople
Members of the Legislative Assembly of Macau